Repton School Dubai, part of Excella, is an international, co-educational school founded in 2007. The school caters to students from ages 3 to 18 and has boarding facilities for students from age 11. It is a partner school of the original Repton School in the UK, founded in 1557. 
 
Repton School Dubai was the first sister school of the UK-based renowned Repton institution within the UAE educational landscape. Repton School Dubai was also the first UK branded international school to start its operations in the UAE. Subsequently, Repton School Abu Dhabi and Repton School Al Barsha were launched in the UAE in 2013. 

According to KHDA (Knowledge and Human Development Authority) inspections, Repton School Dubai was audited and ranked Outstanding in the year 2014 and has maintained its ratings to date.
 
Repton School Dubai offers a full range of the IGCSE curriculum and the IB Diploma, IB Career Programme, and A-Level courses with a choice of 45 subjects in various academic fields. The school houses students from over 80 different nationalities. 
 
The Junior and Senior schools are located on a campus of 1.3 million square feet in Nad Al Sheba 3, making it the largest school in the region.

References

External links 
Repton School Dubai Website

British international schools in Dubai
International schools in Dubai
Boarding schools